Diakos (Greek: Διάκος) may refer to:

Athanasios Diakos (1788–1821), military commander during the Greek War of Independence
Athanasios Diakos, Greece, a mountain village in Phocis, Greece
Athanasiou Diakou Street, Athens, Greece
Dionysis Diakos (1805-1887), military commander during the Greek War of Independence
Ioannis Diakos (1805-1887), military commander during the Greek War of Independence

See also 
Diakou, Patras, Greece